Sick and Tired may refer to:

Film and TV
 Sick and Tired (2006), a stand-up comedy show by Wanda Sykes

Music
 "Sick and Tired" (Chris Kenner song), 1957, covered and made into a hit by Fats Domino in 1958
 "Sick and Tired" a song by Billy Thorpe and the Aztecs in 1964
 "Sick and Tired", a song by Waylon Jennings from his 1970 album Singer of Sad Songs
 "Sick & Tired", a song by Johnny Winter from his 1976 album Together: Edgar Winter And Johnny Winter Live
 "Sick and Tired", a song by Toronto from their 1982 album Get It on Credit
 "Sick and Tired", a song by Everclear from their 1993 album World of Noise
 "Sick & Tired (The Cardigans song)", a song by The Cardigans from their 1994 album Emmerdale
 "Sick and Tired", a song by Black Sabbath from their 1995 album Forbidden
 "Sick & Tired", a song by Eric Clapton from his 1998 album Pilgrim
 "Sick & Tired", a song by Default from their 2001 album The Fallout
 "Sick 'N' Tired", a song by Ms. Dynamite from her 2002 album A Little Deeper
 "Sick & Tired", a song by Nappy Roots from their 2003 album Wooden Leather
 "Sick and Tired", a song by Anastacia, released as a single from her 2004 self-titled album
 "Sick and Tired", a song by Cross Canadian Ragweed from their 2004 album Soul Gravy
 "Sick and Tired", a song by Monica on the Diary of a Mad Black Woman soundtrack
 "Sick and Tired", a song by Mark Klein
 "Candle (Sick and Tired)", a 2008 song by The White Tie Affair